Mutter Courage und ihre Kinder (Mother Courage and Her Children) is a DEFA film which documents the staging of Bertold Brecht's play of the same name from 1959 to 1961, which Manfred Wekwerth and Peter Palitzsch directed with the Berliner Ensemble, modelled after the original production by Bertolt Brecht and Erich Engel from 1949, with Helene Weigel in the title role. The film, made in the German Democratic Republic (GDR), received a prize at the Locarno Film Festival.

History 
Bertold Brecht had directed his play Mutter Courage und ihre Kinder with the Berliner Ensemble, together with Erich Engel, in 1949. Manfred Wekwerth worked as his assistant for the production from 1951. After Brecht's death, the film Mutter Courage und ihre Kinder intended to be a faithful rendering of this model production on stage. It was taken in black and white in 1960 and 1961, with Wekwerth and Peter Palitzsch directing.

The film's first presentation was on 10 February 1961, in the presence of Alexander Abusch, minister of culture, at the Berlin cinema Oranienburger Tor Lichtspiele. The film was shown simultaneously at 14 regional capitals of the GDR, marking the 63rd birthday of Brecht. The first presentation in West Germany was in October 1962 at the Internationale Filmwoche Mannheim. The film was first aired by the Deutscher Fernsehfunk, the GDR television, on 27 March 1973.

Reception 
 wrote in the daily paper Neues Deutschland that the film was a faithful reproduction of the staging which was then performed already 400 times at the theatre of the Berliner Ensemble. Helmut Ullrich of Die Neue Zeit noted that facial expressions were dominant compared with a stage production of the same actors.

Cast

Award 
 1961: Jugendliteraturdiplom at the Locarno Film Festival

Literature 
 F.-B. Habel: Das große Lexikon der DEFA-Spielfilme, Schwarzkopf & Schwarzkopf, Berlin 2000, pp. 424–425

References

External links 
 
 Mutter Courage und ihre Kinder, filmportal.de
 Mutter Courage und ihre Kinder, Filmlexikon

1961 films
East German films
Films based on works by Bertolt Brecht
German black-and-white films
Films scored by Paul Dessau
Filmed stage productions